The scarlet-chested sunbird (Chalcomitra senegalensis) is a species of bird in the family Nectariniidae.

Range
It is found in Angola, Benin, Botswana, Burkina Faso, Burundi, Cameroon, Central African Republic, Chad, Democratic Republic of the Congo, Eswatini, Ivory Coast, Eritrea, Ethiopia, Gambia, Ghana, Guinea, Guinea-Bissau, Kenya, Malawi, Mali, Mauritania, Mozambique, Namibia, Niger, Nigeria, Rwanda, Senegal, Sierra Leone, South Africa, Sudan, Tanzania, Togo, Uganda, Zambia, and Zimbabwe.

Taxonomy

In 1760 the French zoologist Mathurin Jacques Brisson included a description of the scarlet-chested sunbird in his Ornithologie based on a specimen collected in Senegal. He used the French name Le grimpereau violet du Sénégal and the Latin Certhia Senegalensis Violacea. Although Brisson coined Latin names, these do not conform to the binomial system and are not recognised by the International Commission on Zoological Nomenclature. When in 1766 the Swedish naturalist Carl Linnaeus updated his Systema Naturae for the twelfth edition, he added 240 species that had been previously described by Brisson. One of these was the scarlet-chested sunbird. Linnaeus included a brief description, coined the binomial name Certhia senegalensis and cited Brisson's work. This species is now placed in the genus Chalcomitra that was introduced by the German naturalist Ludwig Reichenbach in 1853. Six subspecies are recognised.

References

External links
 Scarlet-chested sunbird - Species text in The Atlas of Southern African Birds.

scarlet-chested sunbird
Birds of Sub-Saharan Africa
scarlet-chested sunbird
scarlet-chested sunbird
Taxonomy articles created by Polbot